Nostri may refer to :

Arrivano i nostri is a 1951 comedy film.
I nostri mariti is a 1966 comedy film.
Membra Jesu Nostri is a cycle of seven cantatas composed by Dieterich Buxtehude in 1680. 
Protectores Augusti Nostri was a title given to individual officers of the Roman Army.
Passio is a passion cantata by Arvo Pärt.
Redemptoris nostri cruciatus is a peace encyclical of Pope Pius XII focusing on the war in Palestine
Sacerdotii nostri primordia ("From the beginning of our priesthood") was the second encyclical issued by Pope John XXIII.